Thomas Watkins Ligon (May 10, 1810January 12, 1881), a Democrat, was the 30th Governor of Maryland in the United States from 1854 to 1858.  He also a member of the United States House of Representatives, serving Maryland's third Congressional district from 1845 until 1849. He was the second Maryland governor born in Virginia and was a minority party governor, who faced bitter opposition from an openly hostile legislature.

Biography
Thomas Watkins Ligon he was born on May 10, 1810, near Farmville, Virginia, the son of Thomas D. Ligon and Martha Watkins. He graduated from Hampden–Sydney College, then entered the University of Virginia.  He graduated from Yale Law School and returned to Virginia where he was admitted to the bar.  In 1833, he moved to Baltimore, Maryland where he practiced law for the next 20 years.  On September 29, 1840, he married Sally Ann Dorsey and made his home in Ellicott City, Maryland. Mrs. Ligon died shortly after their marriage and he married her sister, Mary Tolly Dorsey. He had one son and one daughter.

In 1843, he was elected to a seat in the Maryland House of Delegates from Howard County and in 1845, the Democrats nominated him for Congress. He defeated the incumbent John Wethered by a majority of about 1,000 votes, and was re-elected by a larger margin in 1847.  He served in the Twenty-Ninth and Thirtieth Congresses, taking his seat on December 1, 1845 and retiring on March 3, 1849.

In the gubernatorial election of 1853, the Whigs nominated Richard Johns Bowie of Montgomery County to face Ligon, who had been nominated by the Democrats. Ligon defeated his opponent by about 4,200 votes, but he and his party were in the minority in the Legislature. He was inaugurated on January 11, 1854, and he pledged himself to work for the establishment of a system of common schools, the improvement of Maryland’s soils, and increased aid to agriculture. All these were shortly forgotten, when he and his 'Know-Nothing' opponents in the Legislature came into conflict. He supported the foundation of an agricultural college with an experimental farm attached, a step which the Legislature later took when it established the old Maryland Agricultural College at College Park.  The Know-Nothing Riot of 1856 occurred during his term.

On January 13, 1858, following the election of his 'Know-Nothing' successor Thomas Holliday Hicks, Ligon retired to his Howard County estate 'Chatham' near Ellicott City. He died at his home on January 12, 1881, and was buried in the family cemetery.

Legacy
Ligon Road in the Ellicott City neighborhood of Dunloggin presumably bears his name. He once resided in the Brick House on the Pike, listed on the National Register of Historic Places in 1996. He also resided at White Hall, listed on the National Register of Historic Places in 1977.

References

External links 

 

1810 births
1881 deaths
Democratic Party governors of Maryland
Hampden–Sydney College alumni
People from Ellicott City, Maryland
Democratic Party members of the United States House of Representatives from Maryland
19th-century American politicians